Mayors Organized for Reparations and Equity (MORE) is a coalition of U.S. mayors committed to paying reparations to African American citizens of their cities. The association was announced on June 18, 2021, in commemoration of the first federally recognized Juneteenth holiday. Mayors from such large municipalities as Los Angeles, Denver, Sacramento, and Kansas City are part of the coalition, as well as the mayor of the small town of Tullahassee, Oklahoma, with a population of 83.

Mission 
The program is aimed at supporting African American descendants of slavery. MORE's mission is to establish small pilot reparations programs in the various member cities which then could serve as models for a proposed future federal program to reduce the racial wealth gap. Member mayors vowed to do this by forming local committees of Black leaders to guide their work. In addition, the group promised to support the Commission to Study and Develop Reparation Proposals for African-Americans Act (known as H. R. 40), originally introduced in 1989 by U.S. Representative John Conyers and currently sponsored by Rep. Sheila Jackson Lee of Texas.

Most of the MORE members stressed that rather than direct payments to individuals, reparations would take the form of investments in communities, programs, and nonprofit organizations. Funding sources for the proposed city-led reparations programs were to be determined; MORE organizers estimate that a true national reparations program could cost $12 trillion.

Kansas City Mayor Quinton Lucas summed up MORE's mission this way:

He pointed out that existing federal programs often don't succeed in targeting those most in need:

History 
Mayors Organized for Reparations and Equity was conceived by Los Angeles Mayor Eric Garcetti, in many ways a response to the Black Lives Matter protests of 2020.

MORE was announced on June 19, 2021, with a membership of 11 mayors: Garcetti of Los Angeles, California; Michael Hancock of Denver, Colorado; Jorge Elorza of Providence, Rhode Island; Steve Adler of Austin, Texas; Steve Schewel of Durham, North Carolina: Esther Manheimer of Asheville, North Carolina: Quinton Lucas of Kansas City; Darrell Steinberg of Sacramento, California; Melvin Carter of Saint Paul, Minnesota; and Keisha Currin of Tullahassee, Oklahoma.

Mayors Garcetti and Hancock are co-chairs of MORE, while Michael Tubbs, the former mayor of Stockton, California, was listed as an Emeritus Member. While the mayor of Stockton, Tubbs had led an earlier coalition of 25 mayors, dubbed Mayors for a Guaranteed Income, who had committed to creating guaranteed minimum income programs in their cities "to combat poverty and systemic racism." These programs were to be funded by a mix of public and private funds. In addition to Stockton, other cities in the Tubbs coalition included Los Angeles; Saint Paul; Pittsburgh; Oakland, California; Paterson, New Jersey; Hudson, New York; Mount Vernon, New York; Tacoma, Washington; and Long Beach, California.

Other antecedents to the MORE coalition included reparative actions and commitments by a handful of states and cities: 
 September 2020 — California established a reparations commission. This action prompted L.A. Mayor Garcetti to conceive of MORE.
 July 2020 — Asheville, North Carolina City Council "voted to approve reparations in the form of investments in areas of disparity for Black residents."
 January 2021 — Saint Paul, Minnesota, City Council voted 7–0 to create a reparations commission.
 March 2021 — Evanston, Illinois became the first city in the United States to pay reparations to African American residents (or their descendants) who were victims of unfair housing practices. The Evanston city council 8 to 1 to approve the reparations, which consisted of a $25,000 payment to African American households that can be used as down payments on their homes, house payments, or for home repairs. This was the initial payment, with plans to distribute 10 million dollars in reparations payments to black residents over the next 10 years. Evanston planned to pay for the program partially through a tax on legal marijuana sales.
 March 2021 — The San Francisco Board of Supervisors voted to create an African American Reparations Advisory Committee.
 June 15, 2021 — The Detroit City Council voted to create a reparations commission.

Garcetti promised to "double or even triple" MORE's membership by the end of 2021; to date, only one other mayor, Damon Seils of Carrboro, North Carolina, had joined the coalition.

Later developments 
In April 2022, MORE member Mayor Tishaura Jones of St. Louis signed a bill allowing voluntary donations to a reparations fund. The bill allows St. Louis residents to donate to the fund in their property tax or water and refuse collection bills. The reparations bill, sponsored by a city alderman, was vague on details about eligibility and the potential disbursements of the funds.

In August 2022, MORE member Mayor Jorge Elorza of Providence proposed a $10 million reparations spending plan for the city, using federal coronavirus relief funds.

Member mayors 
The following is a listing of MORE member mayors:

See also 
 Movement for Black Lives

Further reading 
 Beltrán, Bianca. "Advocate of reparations for slavery talks about forms it could take in Kansas City: KC mayor joins leaders across the country in exploring opportunities for reparations," KMBC (June 21, 2021).
 Derosier, Alex. "What would reparations for slavery look like in Minnesota and the US? St. Paul's push to explore reparations for descendants of Black slaves and victims of discriminatory housing practices represents a newer type of push on the issue," Duluth News Tribune (April 15, 2022).
 Logan, Erin B. "L.A. creates advisory commission to study reparations pilot program for some Black Angelenos," Los Angeles Times (June 18, 2021).
 Marohn, Charles. "The Local Case for Reparations," Strong Towns (September 21, 2020).
 Newsome, Melba. "When Reparations Meet Bureaucracy: Asheville's historic reparations resolution made national news in 2020, helping spark a wave of similar city-level initiatives across the country. But mounting delays show that while winning a vote may be hard, moving through a hesitant and halting bureaucracy can be an even more difficult challenge," The Assembly (Oct. 7, 2021).

References

External links
 
 
 
 

Government-related professional associations in the United States
Organizations established in 2021
Reparations for slavery